Kelvin "Kel" W. Earl (born ) is an English former professional rugby league footballer who played in the 1970s.

Background
Kel Earl's birth was registered in Littleborough, Lancashire, England.

Playing career

Challenge Cup Final appearances
Kel Earl was an unused interchange/substitute in St. Helens' 16-13 victory over Leeds in the 1972 Challenge Cup Final during the 1971–72 season at Wembley Stadium, London on Saturday 13 May 1972, in front of a crowd of 89,495, and played right-, i.e. number 10, in Bradford Northern's 14-33 defeat by Featherstone Rovers in the 1973 Challenge Cup Final during the 1972–73 season at Wembley Stadium, London on Saturday 12 May 1973, in front of a crowd of 72,395.

Player's No.6 Trophy Final appearances
Kel Earl played left-, i.e. number 8, in Bradford Northern's 3-2 victory over Widnes in the 1974–75 Player's No.6 Trophy Final during the 1974–75 season at Wilderspool Stadium, Warrington on Saturday 25 January 1975.

References

External links
Search for "Kelvin" at rugbyleagueproject.org
Search for "Kel" at rugbyleagueproject.org
Search for "Earl" at rugbyleagueproject.org
Profile at saints.org.uk
Photograph "Kel Earl Makes A Break" at rlhp.co.uk
Photograph "A Roy Francis half time talk" at rlhp.co.uk
Photograph "The team ready to leave" at rlhp.co.uk
Photograph "The teams take to the field" at rlhp.co.uk
Photograph "The National Anthem" at rlhp.co.uk
Photograph "Hardisty back flip" at rlhp.co.uk
Photograph "Northern's pack at Fartown" at rlhp.co.uk
Photograph "Earl moves in" at rlhp.co.uk

1951 births
Living people
Bradford Bulls players
English rugby league players
Rochdale Hornets players
Rugby league players from Rochdale
Rugby league props
St Helens R.F.C. players
Swinton Lions players